Daniel Enoch Nathanael Nordlander (3 January 1829 – 27 February 1890) was a Swedish Lieutenant Colonel of the Swedish Army, Adjutant to King Charles XV of Sweden, Director-general of Kongl. Telegrafverket, and Member of Parliament of the Riksdag of Sweden of the First Chamber for the Västerbotten County (1883-1885).

Biography 

Daniel Nordlander was born on 3 January 1829 in Uppsala, Sweden, as the son of the vicar and Member of Parliament Nils Nordlander, founder of Skellefteå, and Anna Maria Gestrin. He studied at Härnösand secondary school and was enrolled as a student at Uppsala University on 7 December 1846.

In the military, he was appointed Furir in 1849, Second Lieutenant on 9 July 1850 at the Regiment of Nerike, and Lieutenant on 2 November 1855 after studies at the Higher Artillery School, a predecessor of the Swedish Defence University. In the Swedish Army, he was appointed Captain on 7 March 1862, Major on 15 February 1867, and Lieutenant Colonel on 12 April 1872.

Nordlander served as acting General Staff Officer at the Ministry of Defence in 1855, ordinary General Staff Officer 18 April  1856. He then served as Courier Officer on 5 March 1861 and then Adjutant on 28 January 1864 to King Charles XV of Sweden. He was appointed Manager at the Ministry of Defence 1867–1872.

Thereafter, he was appointed Intendant at Televerket, head of the Northern Telegraph District, and then Director-general of Televerket in 1874.

Daniel Nordlander served as Member of Parliament for the First Chamber of the Riksdag of Sweden for the Västerbotten County (1883-1885).

In addition, he was also a member of the Swedish Order of Freemasons.

Nordlander was elected as member of the Royal Swedish Academy of War Sciences in 1871.

Distinctions

National orders 
 : Commander Grand Cross of the Order of the Polar Star (30 November 1889) (Knight 30 November 1878)
 : Knight of the Order of the Sword (28 January 1871)
 : Knight of the Order of Charles XIII (28 January 1881)

Foreign orders 
 : Chevalier of the Legion of Honour (1867)
 : Knight of the Order of Saints Maurice and Lazarus (1861)
 : Commander 1st Class of the Order of the Dannebrog (1885) (Knight 1862)
 : Knight of the Order of Saint Olav (1862)
 : Knight of the Order of the Red Eagle (1867)
 : Knight of the Order of the Oak Crown (1867)
 : Knight Grand Cordon 2nd Class of the Order of Saint Stanislaus (1879)

See also 
 Nordlander

References 

1829 births
1890 deaths
People from Uppsala
Swedish directors
Members of the Första kammaren
Local politicians in Sweden
Swedish Freemasons
Order of Saint Olav
Commanders First Class of the Order of the Dannebrog
Knights of the Order of Saints Maurice and Lazarus
Knights of the Order of Charles XIII
Knights of the Order of the Sword
Commanders Grand Cross of the Order of the Polar Star
Chevaliers of the Légion d'honneur
Uppsala University alumni
Swedish civil servants
19th-century Swedish businesspeople
19th-century Swedish military personnel
19th-century Swedish politicians
Swedish Army colonels
Recipients of the Order of Saint Stanislaus (Russian), 2nd class